Foreca Ltd /for kā/ is a private Finnish weather forecasting company. It is the largest of its kind in the Nordic countries and is headquartered in Espoo, Finland. Foreca provides weather services for international business use. This service is partly based on data and products of the European Centre for Medium-Range Weather Forecasts.

Foreca was first established in 1996 under the name Weather Service Finland. In January 2001, it changed its name to Foreca as part of its efforts to expand the company internationally.

Foreca provides weather and road weather services to the automotive, digital media, and winter road maintenance industries.
Since 2004, the company has had a contract with Microsoft to produce content for its international MSN websites and Microsoft Windows. Foreca provides weather services for drivers that are customers of companies such as Daimler, BMW, and TomTom.

The company offers a free weather forecast smartphone application called ForecaWeather Free. It provides current conditions, 10-day weather forecasts, and weather animations for locations in the world.

References

See also

Articles
 Finnish Meteorological Institute

External links
 Foreca.fi Official website in Finnish
 Foreca.com Official website in English
 Foreca.mobi Mobile website
 ecmwf.int - European Centre for Medium-range Weather Forecasts
 MSN Weather - Weather site that uses Foreca data for weather forecast information.
 Corporate.foreca.com - Company website for business customers

Technology companies of Finland
Technology companies established in 1996
1996 establishments in Finland
Meteorological companies